George Finkel (July 29, 1936 – April 17, 2019) was an American television sports producer and director. He was the son of architect Maurice Herman Finkel. He graduated from University of Michigan in 1958.

Finkel worked for NBC Sports from August 1971 to February 1990 and won three Emmys, for producing Super Bowl XIII, for 1982 Baseball World Series, and for producing gymnastics at the 1988 Olympics.

He also produced the highest-rated basketball game in television history; the NCAA Final Game in 1979, which featured Michigan State, with Magic Johnson, over Indiana State, with Larry Bird.

References

1936 births
2019 deaths
University of Michigan alumni
American people of Moldovan-Jewish descent
American television producers
American television directors